Pak Hyeongjun (born 1966) is a South Korean poet and university professor.

Life 
Pak Hyeongjun was born in 1966 in Jeongeup, North Jeolla Province, South Korea. He graduated from the Seoul Institute of the Arts with a degree in creative writing, then attended Myongji University for graduate school, where he earned his Master's degree and doctorate. While still relatively young Pak Hyeongjun moved from his countryside hometown of Jeongeup to Incheon, South Korea's third-most populated city after Seoul and Busan. Pak confessed that this experience inspired him to begin writing poetry, saying that, while he was living in Incheon, he "felt often as if I was stagnant even though I was endlessly drifting. But I think that was what drove me to write poetry."

At Seoul Institute of the Arts, Pak Hyeongjun studied under the well-known poets Oh Kyu-won and Choe Ha-rin. Pak began his literary career when his poem "The Strength of Furniture" won the Korea Times New Writer's Award in 1991. He has also received the Dream and Poetry Literary Award (1996), the Dongsuh Literary Award (2002), the Contemporary Poetics Award (2005), the Sowol Poetry Prize (2009), and the Yuksa Poetry Award (2012). In 2014 he began working as a professor of creative writing at Dongguk University.

Writing
Pak Hyeongjun's work has been described as "reinterpreting the tradition of Korean lyric poetry in the most modern way." His first poetry collection, I Would Now Like To Talk About the Disappearance (1994), was very well received by critics. Much of his poetry focuses on time, on the past, present, and future, and on memory and loss of memory. His more recent poetry collection, The Burned House (2013), further expanded upon these topics.

Works

Poetry collections
 I Would Now Like To Talk About the Disappearance (1994)
 A Mirror with a Scent of Bread (1997)
 The Leaves Have Blossomed into the Water (2002)
 Dance (2005)
 I Cried at Every Thought of It (2011)
 The Burned House (2013)

Essay collections
 The Pattern of the Evening (2003)
 Hungry for Beauty (2007)
 A Poem for You (2013)
 The Note of Silence (2013)

Awards
 1996 1st Dream and Poetry Literary Award  
 2002 15th Dongsuh Literary Award  
 2005 10th Contemporary Poetics Award  
 2009 24th Sowol Poetry Prize
 2012 9th Yuksa Poetry Award

References

1966 births
20th-century South Korean poets
21st-century South Korean poets
South Korean male poets
Living people
20th-century male writers
21st-century male writers